Eric Persing is an american sound designer, professional synthesist and producer based in Los Angeles, California. He is best known as the Founder and Creative Director of the music software and virtual instrument company Spectrasonics. He has been a major contributor to all of Spectrasonics' products, including Omnisphere, Keyscape, Stylus RMX, Trilian, Atmosphere and Trilogy.

Persing started working for the Roland Corporation as Chief Sound Designer from 1984 to 2004, where he worked on many influential synthesizers and music-related products such as the Roland D-50, the JD-800, the Roland JX, JV, JP, XP series synthesizers and many others. Even today, his sounds can be heard in many productions.

At the 2011 NAMM Show, as part of a joint promotion with the Bob Moog Foundation, Persing exhibited the OMG-1 synthesizer, a unique synthesizer of his own design that integrated a Moog Little Phatty with an Apple Mac Mini and two iPads running virtual instruments, all housed in a custom curly maple cabinet.

Important influences for Persing are Vangelis, Kraftwerk, Jan Hammer, Yes, Genesis and Thomas Dolby.

Awards
In 2011, Persing and his team accepted the TEC Award for "Best Musical Instrument Software" for Omnisphere version 1.5.

References

External links
 2011 Interview on kvraudio.com
 2000 Interview in SOS magazine
 Official bio on spectrasonics.net
 Eric Persing Roland contributions
 2009 Interview on TraxMusic.org
2011 Interview for NAMM Oral History Program

1963 births
Living people
American sound designers
20th-century births
German expatriates in the United States
German emigrants to the United States